New Year Lake is a lake in northwestern Washoe County, Nevada. Explorer John C. Frémont passed New Year Lake on December 26, 1843 during his second expedition. The lake appeared unnamed on the map he created after the expedition in 1845.

The name of New Year Lake was changed into Crook's Lake in the Geographic Names Information System (GNIS) in 1966. This happened after a local rancher sent a note to the Board on Geographic Names, in which he wrote that the lake was called "Crooks Lake" ever since a battle took place in 1867 near the lake between General George Crook and the Northern Paiute. The name change was reversed in 1989, because the name "New Year Lake" was used historically. "Crooks Lake" is listed as a variant name together with Roops Lake.

References 

Geography of Washoe County, Nevada
Lakes of Nevada
Lakes of the Great Basin